Bert and John is an album by the folk musicians Bert Jansch and John Renbourn, released in 1966. The two would later play together in the group Pentangle. An expanded version of the album was later released in America in 1969 by Vanguard as Stepping Stones. It featured two extra tracks, "It Don't Bother Me" and "My Lover".

Track listing 
All tracks credited to Bert Jansch and John Renbourn, except where specified.

References 

Bert Jansch albums
1966 albums
John Renbourn albums
Transatlantic Records albums
Albums produced by Bill Leader